Arctides is a genus of slipper lobsters, containing three species. The other two species are smaller, at up to  carapace length; A. guineensis is found in an area similar to the Bermuda Triangle; A. regalis is widely distributed in the Indo-Pacific, from the Mascarene Islands to Hawaii and Easter Island.

References

Achelata